Pleasant Hill, West Virginia may refer to the following communities in West Virginia:
Pleasant Hill, Calhoun County, West Virginia
Pleasant Hill, Jackson County, West Virginia
Pleasant Hill, Wood County, West Virginia